Omar Twihri   (Known As JenJoon; born on 10 August 1992, in Jendouba), is a Tunisian musician, specializing in rap and pop music which is widely known in Tunisia as Tunisian underground music.

Career 
Omar Twihri   started his musical career at a young age after he dropped out of school due to financial issues in 2005. Later, he named himself JenJoon, which means the little jinn. JenJoon, as he named himself, faced a lot of issues such as the lack of money, no studios available where he lives in the northwest of Tunisia. In 2018, Twihri moved to Tunis the capital. At first, he worked in a bar to save money so he can start recording his music. Then, he met many famous people; some were racist with him, others encouraged him, which made him determined to succeed. Now, JenJoon is one of the top-listed musicians in the Tunisian music industry. With over 600 thousand subscribers on YouTube, his content has over 104 million total views since 2012, he made his dream come true.

Discography

2014

2017

2018

2019

2020

2021

References

External links 
 

1991 births
Tunisian musicians
Living people